The 1874 South Australian football season was the twelfth year of interclub football in South Australia.

Metropolitan football matches

June 13

June 22

July 4

July 18

August 1

August 7

August 15

Kensington were scheduled to play Victorian at Kensington but the latter failed to appear; the umpire awarded the match to Kensington on forfeit.

August 22

August 29

September 5

Ladder 
In the table below, Senior Results is based only upon games played against senior clubs; the record listed under W-L-D is the record over all matches, including those against country and junior teams. The Senior Results include the premiership play-off match.

References

1874 in Australian sport
Australian rules football competition seasons
South Australian football season